The Penske PC-16 was a CART open-wheel race car, designed by Penske Racing, which was constructed for competition in the 1987 season. The chassis debuted with poor results at the season-opening races, and struggled mightily to get up to speed at Indianapolis. Midway through the first week of practice, the Penske team parked the PC-16 in favor of their backup cars, a contingent of March 86C chassis.

Designer Alan Jenkins was fired from Penske, and later replaced with Nigel Bennett.

Gallery

Complete Indy Car World Series results
(key)

*Includes points scored by other cars.

External links
 penskeracing.com

References

Indianapolis 500
Team Penske
American Championship racing cars